1st Combat Engineer Battalion is a combat engineer battalion of the United States Marine Corps. The unit, nicknamed "The Super Breed", is based at Marine Corps Base Camp Pendleton, California and falls under the command of the 1st Marine Division and the I Marine Expeditionary Force.

Mission
Provide mobility, counter mobility, survivability, and limited general engineering support to the 1st Marine Division.

Current units
 Headquarters and Service Company
 Company A (rein)
 Company B (rein)
 Company C (rein)
 Mobility Assault Company
 Engineer Support Company

History

World War II
The battalion was formed on 24 February 1941 at Guantanamo Bay, Cuba, as the 1st Pioneer Battalion, 1st Marine Division to be a specialized unit to conduct shore party operations during amphibious assaults, and to provide close combat engineer support to the Marine infantry. The average age of the enlisted men was about 18, and they referred to themselves as "draft dodgers" because all were volunteers. They relocated during April 1941 to Marine Corps Recruit Depot Parris Island, South Carolina and again in September 1941 to "Tent City One" at Marine Corps Air Station New River, North Carolina

During World War II, the Pioneer Battalion consisted of a headquarters and three pioneer companies with each pioneer company consisting of a headquarters and three pioneer platoons. The Pioneer Battalion together with an Engineer Battalion and a Seabee Battalion comprised the 17th Marines, the Division's Engineer Regiment.

On 14 June 1942 the battalion traveled by a five-day train journey to San Francisco, with the final destination of Wellington, New Zealand which was not disclosed to personnel at the time. The sail to New Zealand was on the USAT John Ericsson (NY-307), a former Swedish deluxe cruise liner the S.S. Kungsholms, departing from the Oakland Naval Base. They were redesignated on 12 January 1943 as the 1st Battalion, 17th Marines and again on 30 June 1944 as the First Engineer Battalion

The battalion participated in combat during the Battle of Guadalcanal, Eastern New Guinea, Battle of New Britain, Battle of Peleliu and the Battle of Okinawa. Following the war they were sent to Tientsin, China in September 1945 as peacekeepers and returned to the United States during June 1947 to Camp Pendleton, California

Korean War
The battalion deployed during August 1950 to Kobe, Japan, joining the 1st Provisional Marine Brigade they were then sent in September 1950 to Inchon, Korea, and joined the 1st Marine Division.

During the war they participated in the following battles:
Battle of Pusan Perimeter
Battle of Inchon-Seoul
Battle of Chosin Reservoir
 East-Central Front
 Western Front

Following the armistice the battalion participated in the defense of the Korean Demilitarized Zone from August 1953 – April 1955. They returned to Camp Pendleton, California in April 1955 and were again redesignated on 1 May 1957 as the 1st Pioneer Battalion.

Vietnam War
The battalion was again redesignated on 1 May 1963 as the 1st Engineer Battalion and departed San Diego Harbor with the 7th Marine Regiment (RLT-7) on WW-II Troop Ships USS Pickaway (APA-222) and USS Renville (APA-227) on 23 May 1965 for Camp Hansen, Okinawa, with a brief stop-over at Pearl Harbor Hawaii. From Okinawa they deployed to Qui-Nhon SVN, landing there on 06-7 July 1965. On 10 November 1965 7th Marines re-deployed to Chu Lai in the Republic of Vietnam. One Marine was lost on the USS Renville while en route to Hawaii due to appendicitis which was misdiagnosed as sea-sickness.

During the Vietnam War the 1st Engineer Battalion supported 1st, 2nd, and 3rd Battalions of the 1st 5th and 7th Marines in combat operations from July 1965 through April 1971, operating from Qui-Nhon, Chu-Lai and Da-Nang, the most famous of which was Operation "Starlight" conducted August 1965 where Sgt. Robert E. O'Malley was awarded the first Marine Corps Medal of Honor of the Vietnam War.

1980s and 1990s
The battalion participated in Operations Desert Shield and Desert Storm in Southwest Asia from August 1990 until March 1991. In May 1992, the unit was brought out to conduct riot control operations in the city and county of Los Angeles during the 1992 Los Angeles riots. They would later take part in Operation Restore Hope in Somalia from December 1992 – February 1993. Elements would participate in Fire-Fighting efforts in the Western United States during August and September 1994.

Global War on Terror

The battalion has participated in Operation Iraqi Freedom from March 2003 until the present. The battalion headquarters and 3 engineer companies were deployed to Afghanistan in 2009 as part of the NATO counterinsurgency offensive in the Helmand Province, to Musa Qal’eh in 2010, and returned again, 2011 and 2013 .

Unit awards

A unit citation or commendation is an award bestowed upon an organization for the action cited. Members of the unit who participated in said actions are allowed to wear on their uniforms the awarded unit citation. 1st CEB has been presented with the following awards:

See also

List of United States Marine Corps battalions
Organization of the United States Marine Corps

Notes

References

 Lane, Kerry, Guadalcanal Marine, University Press of Mississippi, 2004

Web
 1st CEB's official website

CEB1
1st Marine Division (United States)